Ctenochaetus binotatus, commonly known as the twospot surgeonfish, is a tang fish native to the Indo-Pacific region, excluding the Red Sea, Hawaii and the Marquesan Islands.

It is a brownish colour with green tinged stripes along the body and similarly coloured spots on the face. The eye is surrounded by a small area of vivid blue.

It occasionally makes its way into the aquarium trade.

References

External links
http://www.marinespecies.org/aphia.php?p=taxdetails&id=219655
 

Acanthuridae
Fish described in 1955